Anisothrix agamalis is a species of snout moth in the genus Anisothrix. It was described by George Hampson in 1906, and is known from Venezuela.

References

Moths described in 1906
Chrysauginae
Moths of South America